Aidin Mahmutović (born 6 April 1986) is a Bosnian professional footballer who plays as a forward for Bosnian club Čelik Zenica.

Personal life
Mahmutović is married to Emina Ademović. He lived in Bosnia and Herzegovina during the Yugoslav Wars.

Honours
Teplice
Czech Cup: 2008–09

Viktoria Plzeň
Czech First League: 2014–15
Czech Supercup: 2015

References

External links

1986 births
Living people
People from Doboj
Association football forwards
Bosnia and Herzegovina footballers
Bosnia and Herzegovina under-21 international footballers
NK Čelik Zenica players
FK Teplice players
FK Ústí nad Labem players
FC Viktoria Plzeň players
SK Sigma Olomouc players
1. FK Příbram players
Panionios F.C. players
FK Tuzla City players
Premier League of Bosnia and Herzegovina players
Czech First League players
Super League Greece players
Bosnia and Herzegovina expatriate footballers
Expatriate footballers in the Czech Republic
Bosnia and Herzegovina expatriate sportspeople in the Czech Republic
Expatriate footballers in Greece
Bosnia and Herzegovina expatriate sportspeople in Greece